Zavodske is a city in Lokhvytsia Raion, Poltava Oblast, Ukraine. Population:

History
Founded in 1928, until 1962 it was known as Stalinka before changing to Chervonozavodske (Russian: Краснозаводское). It was the site of a large World War II tank battle involving the 2nd SS Panzer Division. Following the 2015 law on decommunization the city was renamed early February 2016 to its current name Zavodske. The city is located on the terraces of the left bank of the Sula River in the forest-steppe zone of the Dnieper lowland in the north of the Poltava region - 12 km from the regional center of Lokhvitsa and 160 km from the city of Poltava.

Objects of social sphere 
 Two secondary schools
 Vocational school № 32
 Lokhvitsky College of Mechanics and Technology of the Poltava State Agrarian Academy.
 Two houses of culture.
 Children's music school.
 Children's studio "Sonyachny Bunny"

Gallery

References

External links
 City Chervonozavodske (official webpage)
 Webcams, which are broadcast in real time

Cities in Poltava Oblast
Populated places established in the Ukrainian Soviet Socialist Republic
Cities of district significance in Ukraine
City name changes in Ukraine
Former Soviet toponymy in Ukraine